Tourism in Abkhazia is possible under Georgian law for foreigners entering the occupied territory from Georgia, although Georgia cannot assure the safety inside disputed territory.
However, the Abkazian beaches on the Black Sea continue to be accessible for tourists coming from the Russian side of the Abkhazia–Russia border which is not under Georgian control. Low prices and an absence of any visa requirements attracts Russian tourists especially those who can not afford the vacations in Turkey, Egypt, Bulgaria and other popular Russian touristic directions.

Background 

During the time of the Soviet Union, Abkhazia's Black Sea beaches attracted tourists from a number of surrounding countries, constituting a 40 percent share of the Georgian Soviet Socialist Republic's tourism market. Prior to the 1992-93 war in Abkhazia, over 202,000 tourists visited the region every year. Abkhazia is now a disputed region, with Russia, Nicaragua, Venezuela and Nauru as the only United Nations member states that recognise the territory as an independent nation.

Despite the risks involved, about one million tourists visit Abkhazia each year, mainly from Russia. One of the attraction of visiting Abkhazia as opposed to other Black Sea coastal towns, such as Sochi, is the lower cost of visiting the breakaway state. One night's accommodation in Gagra, for example, cost US$25 in 2003, with the cheapest hotel in the region setting a rate of US$12 for a room and meals in that year. A trainride from a Russian border town of Sochi to the Abkhazian capital of Sukhumi only cost US$1 in 2003. However, Abkhazia's tourism facilities are below Western standards, with much of its infrastructure dating back to the Soviet era.

Tourism attractions 

Abkhazia lies on the coast of the Black Sea, and as such, much of its tourism appeal is derived from its coastal resort towns. A number of resort facilities exist in easy and cheap reach of Russian tourists, with Sukhumi and Gagra two of the most popular towns. Tourism is most prevalent in the region's north.
Some of the tourist attractions include:
 Sukhumi Botanical Garden
 Besleti Bridge
 Sukhumi Lighthouse
 Kelasuri Wall
 Lake Ritsa
 New Athos Monastery
 Iverian Mountain
 New Athos Cave
 Krubera Cave, the second deepest known cave on Earth
 Bagrat's Castle

Legal status 
As part of organized tourist groups from travel companies registered in Abkhazia or in Russia, tourists from all countries (except Georgia) can visit Abkhazia without an Abkhazian visa by land only through Russia, for a period of no more than 24 hours. Crossing the border with Abkhazia from Russia is free, but according to the Georgian law visitors may only enter Abkhazia from Georgia. (In practice, it is impossible to get from the territory of Georgia to the territory of Abkhazia, since there are no checkpoints between them.) Despite that, the fact of crossing the border is easy to hide because the Abkhazian custom officials don't make any stamps in the visitors' passports since 2014.

See also
 Visa policy of Abkhazia

References

External links 
 
 Tourist site of Abkhazia Republic

 
+Abkhazia
+Abkhazia